The canton of Pernes-les-Fontaines is a French administrative division in the department of Vaucluse and region Provence-Alpes-Côte d'Azur.

Composition
At the French canton reorganisation which came into effect in March 2015, the canton was expanded from 6 to 21 communes:

Aurel
Le Beaucet
Bédoin
Blauvac
Crillon-le-Brave
Flassan
Malemort-du-Comtat
Mazan
Méthamis
Modène
Monieux
Mormoiron
Pernes-les-Fontaines 
La Roque-sur-Pernes 
Saint-Christol
Saint-Didier
Saint-Pierre-de-Vassols
Saint-Trinit
Sault
Venasque 
Villes-sur-Auzon

References

Pernes-les-Fontaines